Hyposmocoma partita is a species of moth of the family Cosmopterigidae. It was first described by Lord Walsingham in 1907. It is endemic to the island of Hawaii.

The larva is probably a case maker.

External links

partita
Endemic moths of Hawaii
Moths described in 1907
Taxa named by Thomas de Grey, 6th Baron Walsingham